Andvord may refer to:

Richard Andvord (1839–1913), Norwegian businessperson and founder of Rich. Andvord
Rolf T. Andvord (1847–1906), Norwegian 
Kristian Andvord (1855–1934), Norwegian physician
Richard Andvord (born 1886) (1886–1965), Norwegian military officer
Rolf Andvord (1890–1976), Norwegian diplomat
Richard Andvord (born 1920) (1920–1997), Norwegian businessperson

See also
Andvord Bay
Rich. Andvord, Norwegian company